AP-2 complex subunit alpha-1 is a protein that in humans is encoded by the AP2A1 gene.

This gene encodes the alpha 1 adaptin subunit of the adaptor protein 2 (AP2 adaptors) complex found in clathrin coated vesicles. The AP-2 complex is a heterotetramer consisting of two large adaptins (alpha or beta), a medium adaptin (mu), and a small adaptin (sigma). The complex is part of the protein coat on the cytoplasmic face of coated vesicles which links clathrin to receptors in vesicles. Alternative splicing of this gene results in two transcript variants encoding two different isoforms. A third transcript variant has been described, but its full length nature has not been determined.

Interactions
Adaptor-related protein complex 2, alpha 1 has been shown to interact with DPYSL2 and NUMB.

References

Further reading

External links